In fluid dynamics, the Stokes stream function is used to describe the streamlines and flow velocity in a three-dimensional incompressible flow with axisymmetry. A surface with a constant value of the Stokes stream function encloses a streamtube, everywhere tangential to the flow velocity vectors. Further, the volume flux within this streamtube is constant, and all the streamlines of the flow are located on this surface. The velocity field associated with the Stokes stream function is solenoidal—it has zero divergence. This stream function is named in honor of George Gabriel Stokes.

Cylindrical coordinates

Consider a cylindrical coordinate system ( ρ , φ , z ), with the z–axis the line around which the incompressible flow is axisymmetrical, φ the azimuthal angle and ρ the distance to the z–axis. Then the flow velocity components uρ and uz can be expressed in terms of the Stokes stream function  by:

The azimuthal velocity component uφ does not depend on the stream function. Due to the axisymmetry, all three velocity components ( uρ , uφ , uz ) only depend on ρ and z and not on the azimuth φ.

The volume flux, through the surface bounded by a constant value ψ of the Stokes stream function, is equal to 2π ψ.

Spherical coordinates

In spherical coordinates ( r , θ , φ ), r is the radial distance from the origin, θ is the zenith angle and φ is the azimuthal angle. In axisymmetric flow, with θ = 0 the rotational symmetry axis, the quantities describing the flow are again independent of the azimuth φ. The flow velocity components ur and uθ are related to the Stokes stream function  through:

Again, the azimuthal velocity component uφ is not a function of the Stokes stream function ψ. The volume flux through a stream tube, bounded by a surface of constant ψ, equals 2π ψ, as before.

Vorticity

The vorticity is defined as:

, where 

with  the unit vector in the –direction.
{| class="toccolours collapsible collapsed" width="60%" style="text-align:left"
!Derivation of vorticity  using a Stokes stream function
|-
|Consider the vorticity as defined by

From the definition of the curl in spherical coordinates:

Secondly substitute  and  into  The result is:

Next the following algebra is performed:

|}

As a result, from the calculation the vorticity vector is found to be equal to:

Comparison with cylindrical
The cylindrical and spherical coordinate systems are related through

  and

Alternative definition with opposite sign 
As explained in the general stream function article, definitions using an opposite sign convention – for the relationship between the Stokes stream function and flow velocity – are also in use.

Zero divergence
In cylindrical coordinates, the divergence of the velocity field u becomes:

as expected for an incompressible flow.

And in spherical coordinates:

Streamlines as curves of constant stream function
From calculus it is known that the gradient vector  is normal to the curve  (see e.g. Level set#Level sets versus the gradient).

Cylindrical coordinates
In cylindrical coordinates,

.

and  

So that

Spherical coordinates
And in spherical coordinates

and 

So that

Notes

References

 Originally published in 1879, the 6th extended edition appeared first in 1932.
Reprinted in: 

Fluid dynamics